The Drummoyne District Rugby Football Club is a rugby union club based in Drummoyne, New South Wales, in Sydney, Australia. Its predecessor Glebe and Balmain Rugby Clubs are among the oldest in Australia and today it competes prominently in the First Division of the New South Wales Suburban Rugby Union.

History
According to its website, the Drummoyne DRFC traces its origins to the very foundations of rugby union in Australia, with its predecessor Balmain Rugby Club formed in 1873, and winning the newly formed Southern Rugby Union's first competition in 1875. In neighbouring Glebe, another rugby club was founded in 1889 and these two clubs formed the foundation of Drummoyne. The Glebe-Balmain Club was established in 1919 and decided to change its name to the Drummoyne District Rugby Football Club in 1931.

The club has produced many representative players, the first Rugby Union team to leave Australian shores for an overseas tour, the historic 1882 NSW team to NZ, included 3 players from the Balmain Club: M.H.Howard, R.W.Thallon and C.Hawkins. In 1909-10 Bill McKell, later to become Australia's Governor General, played on the wing for Balmain and the very first Wallaby Captain, Dr.H.Moran of the 1908 Australian side, served as Balmain's president in 1911-12.

Honours

Sydney Premiership
 Shute Shield: (2) 1925, 1936

Division 1 Championships
 Kentwell Cup: (8) 1947, 2000, 2004, 2006, 2007, 2008, 2010, 2012 and 2020.
 Division 1 Club Championship - Bruce Graham Shield: (3) 2004, 2008, 2012 and 2020. 
 Burke Cup: (2) 2000, 2004 and 2019
 Whiddon Cup: (3) 2001, 2015, 2017
 Sutherland Cup: (1) 2010

Division 2 Championships
 Barraclough Cup: (1) 1999
 Stockdale Cup: (1) 1999

Division 3 Championships
 Division 3 Club Championship - Keith 'Doc' Harris Shield (1) 1997
 Clark Cup: (1) 1997
 Nicholson Cup: (1) 1997

Division 4 Championships
 McLean Cup: (1) 1996
 Grose Cup: (1) 1996

Colours and home ground
Drummoyne's club colours are red, black and yellow and its home ground is Drummoyne Oval. The club fields junior and senior teams and a women's sevens rugby side.

International representatives

Steve Williams
 Douglas Keller
 Greg Davis
 Alan Cardy
 Eric Ford
 Jack Ford

 Arthur McGill
 John Freedman
 Ian Moutray
 Lewis 'Taff' Williams

References

External links

Further reading
"Men in Scarlet" - The History of the Balmain, Glebe & Drummoyne Rugby Clubs 1874-2004, by John Mulford.

Rugby union teams in Sydney
1931 establishments in Australia
Rugby clubs established in 1931